Iron (Ossetic: Ирон, Iron or Ирон ӕвзаг, Iron ævzag) is one of the two main dialects of the Ossetic language along with Digor spoken in the Caucasus. The majority of Ossetians speak Iron, notably in the East, South and Central parts of North Ossetia–Alania, while in the West the Digor dialect is more prevalent. The Iron dialect has been the basis of the Ossetian written language since the abolition of the Digor standard in 1939.

See also 
 Iron people

Notes

Ossetia
Eastern Iranian languages
Languages of Russia
Ossetian language